Urmeyville is an unincorporated community in Needham Township, Johnson County, Indiana.

History
Urmeyville was platted in 1866. A post office was established at Urmeyville in 1866, and remained in operation until it was discontinued in 1898.

Geography

References

Unincorporated communities in Johnson County, Indiana
Unincorporated communities in Indiana
Indianapolis metropolitan area